Road signs in Russia ensure that transport vehicles move safely and orderly, as well as to inform the participants of traffic built-in graphic icons. These icons are governed by the Vienna Convention on Road Traffic and Vienna Convention on Road Signs and Signals. Russian road signs are similar to the road signs in other post-Soviet countries.

GOST 10807-78 is the official typeface of Russia's road signs. However, Arial can also be used on Russian road signs instead of GOST 10807-78.

History 
The world's first road signs were approved at an international conference of motorists in 1909; among the participants were the Russian Empire. There were four road signs of that time and all of them were round: "uneven surface", "crossroads", "bends", and "railway crossing". New road signs and signals were officially adopted already in the USSR on December 1, 1927. In 1933, the number of road signs in the USSR was increased to 23 and they received the current shapes and colours, and for the first time they were divided into three categories: "warning", "prohibition" and "indicative". The following changes and additions regarding road signs were adopted on January 1, 1961, after the USSR joined the Geneva Convention on Road Traffic in 1959. The number of road signs has increased to 36. All signs received a yellow background. In 1968, the Convention on Road Traffic and Road Signs and Signals was created in Vienna. Among the countries that adopted the Vienna Convention was the USSR. New rules of the road, as well as road signs adopted by this convention, entered into force in the USSR in 1973. Subsequently, changes and additions to the rules of the road, road signs and signals were made in 1975, 1976, 1979, 1980, 1984 and 1987.

Currently, the most common signs are made on a metal substrate covered with a reflective film. Signs that are illuminated around the perimeter or along the contour of the image of the sign, made using miniature incandescent lamps or LEDs, have become slightly widespread.

In February 2019, the traffic police supported proposals for the introduction of reduced road signs, the idea was initiated by the Moscow government. They are planned to be installed throughout Russia after a successful experiment.

Warning signs

Priority signs

Prohibitory signs

Prescriptive signs

Signs of special regulations

Information signs

Service Marks

Additional Information signs (plates)

References 

Road transport in Russia
Russia